Aurelia Brădeanu (née Stoica; born 5 May 1979) is a Romanian handballer who last played for CSM Bucharest. She participated at the 2000 Summer Olympics in Sydney, at the 2008 Summer Olympics in Beijing and at the 2016 Summer Olympics in Rio de Janeiro. She is among the top 10 all-time league goalscorers of Győri Audi ETO KC, with 656 goals in 155 appearances. Brădeanu was the captain of Romania and retired from the national team on 27 November 2016.

International honours

Club
EHF Champions League:
Winner: 2016
Silver Medalist: 2009
Bronze Medalist: 2017
EHF Cup:
Finalist: 2005
EHF Cup Winners' Cup:
Finalist: 2006
Semifinalist: 2002

National team
Youth World Championship:
Gold Medalist: 1999
Youth European Championship:
Gold Medalist: 1998
European Championship:
Bronze Medalist: 2010
Fourth Place: 2000
World Championship:
Silver Medalist: 2005
Bronze Medalist: 2015
Fourth Place: 1999, 2007

Individual awards
 Romanian Handballer of the Year: 2003, 2013

Gallery

References
 

1979 births
Living people
Sportspeople from Slatina, Romania
Romanian female handball players
Handball players at the 2000 Summer Olympics
Handball players at the 2008 Summer Olympics
Handball players at the 2016 Summer Olympics
Olympic handball players of Romania
Expatriate handball players
Romanian expatriate sportspeople in Hungary
Győri Audi ETO KC players
SCM Râmnicu Vâlcea (handball) players